Sir William Coningsby ( – September 1540) was an English Member of Parliament and a Justice of the King's Bench.

Biography
William Coningsby was born by 1483, the son of Sir Humphrey Coningsby of Aldenham, Hertfordshire. He was educated at Eton,and King's College, Cambridge, becoming a Fellow of that college. He was Lent Reader at the Inner Temple in 1519, Treasurer of the same Inn, 1525–6, Reader again in 1526 and one of the Governors of the Inner Temple in 1533–4, and 1538–9. He was one of the Commissioners appointed  to hear causes in Chancery in relief of Cardinal Wolsey, in 1529.

Coningsby was Recorder of Lynn from 1524 until his death in September 1540 and appointed a serjeant-at-law and Justice of the King's Bench in 1540. In 1536 he was elected to represent King's Lynn in Parliament.

Coningsby was one of the governors of the Inner Temple in 1533–40, 1536–7, and 1538–9. In 1539-40 he was arraigned in the Starchamber and sent to the Tower for advising Sir John Shelton to make a will upon a secret trust, in contravention of the Statute of Uses  (27 Hen. VIII, c. 10). He was released after ten days’ confinement, but lost the offices of prothonotary of the king's bench and attorney of the duels of Lancaster, which he then held. On 5 July of the same year he was appointed to a puisne judgeship in the king's bench, and was knighted; but as his name is not included in the writ of summons to parliament in the next year, it would seem that he died or retired soon after his appointment. Coningsby was also recorder of Lynn in Norfolk, in which county his seat, Eaton Hell, near  Wallington, was situate.

Family
Coningsby had married Beatrice, the daughter of Thomas Thoresby of Lynn and the widow of William Trew. They had a son, Christopher (1516– 15 September 1547), and four daughters. His daughter Margaret (c1522–1598) married Sir Robert Alington, the son of Sir Giles Alington, of Horseheath, High Sheriff of Cambridgeshire. She married secondly Thomas Pledger in Bottisham in that county.

His son Christopher Coningsby had three daughters and coheiresses. Anne married Alexander Balam of Elme in Cambridgeshire,  Elizabeth married Francis Gawdy, Esq. and Amy married Thomas Clarke of Avington in Northamptonshire.

Notes

References
  (Arms given).
 

Attribution
 

1540 deaths
Alumni of King's College, Cambridge
People educated at Eton College
Year of birth unknown
Justices of the King's Bench
Lawyers from London
English MPs 1536
Serjeants-at-law (England)
16th-century English judges
16th-century English lawyers
People from Hertsmere (district)
Year of birth uncertain